The Golden Rule is the principle of treating others as one wants to be treated. Various expressions of this rule can be found in the tenets of most religions and creeds through the ages. It can be considered an ethic of reciprocity in some religions, although different religions treat it differently.

The maxim may appear as a positive or negative injunction governing conduct:
 Treat others as you would like others to treat you (positive or directive form)
 Do not treat others in ways that you would not like to be treated (negative or prohibitive form)
 What you wish upon others, you wish upon yourself (empathetic or responsive form)

The idea dates at least to the early Confucian times (551–479 BCE), according to Rushworth Kidder, who identifies the concept appearing prominently in Buddhism, Christianity, Hinduism, Islam, Judaism, Taoism, Zoroastrianism, and "the rest of the world's major religions". As part of the 1993 "Declaration Toward a Global Ethic", 143 leaders of the world's major faiths endorsed the Golden Rule. According to Greg M. Epstein, it is "a concept that essentially no religion misses entirely", but belief in God is not necessary to endorse it. Simon Blackburn also states that the Golden Rule can be "found in some form in almost every ethical tradition".

Etymology
The term "Golden Rule", or "Golden law", began to be used widely in the early 17th century in Britain by Anglican theologians and preachers; the earliest known usage is that of Anglicans Charles Gibbon and Thomas Jackson in 1604.

Ancient history

Ancient Egypt
Possibly the earliest affirmation of the maxim of reciprocity, reflecting the ancient Egyptian goddess Ma'at, appears in the story of "The Eloquent Peasant", which dates to the Middle Kingdom: "Now this is the command: Do to the doer to make him do." This proverb embodies the do ut des principle. A Late Period papyrus contains an early negative affirmation of the Golden Rule: "That which you hate to be done to you, do not do to another."

Ancient India

Sanskrit tradition
In Mahābhārata, the ancient epic of India, there is a discourse in which sage Brihaspati tells the king Yudhishthira the following about dharma, a philosophical understanding of values and actions that lend good order to life:

The Mahābhārata is usually dated to the period between 400 BCE and 400 CE.

Tamil tradition
In Chapter 32 in the Book of Virtue of the Tirukkuṛaḷ, Valluvar says:

Furthermore, in verse 312, Valluvar says that it is the determination or code of the spotless (virtuous) not to do evil, even in return, to those who have cherished enmity and done them evil. According to him, the proper punishment to those who have done evil is to put them to shame by showing them kindness, in return and to forget both the evil and the good done on both sides (verse 314).

Ancient Greece
The Golden Rule in its prohibitive (negative) form was a common principle in ancient Greek philosophy. Examples of the general concept include:
 "Avoid doing what you would blame others for doing." – Thales ( – )
 "What you do not want to happen to you, do not do it yourself either." – Sextus the Pythagorean. The oldest extant reference to Sextus is by Origen in the third century of the common era.
 "Ideally, no one should touch my property or tamper with it, unless I have given him some sort of permission, and, if I am sensible I shall treat the property of others with the same respect." – Plato ( – )
 "Do not do to others that which angers you when they do it to you." – Isocrates (436–338 BCE)
 "It is impossible to live a pleasant life without living wisely and well and justly, and it is impossible to live wisely and well and justly without living pleasantly." – Epicurus (341–270 BC) where "justly" refers to "an agreement made in reciprocal association ... against the infliction or suffering of harm."

Ancient Persia
The Pahlavi Texts of Zoroastrianism ( – 1000 CE) were an early source for the Golden Rule: "That nature alone is good which refrains from doing to another whatsoever is not good for itself." Dadisten-I-dinik, 94,5, and "Whatever is disagreeable to yourself do not do unto others." Shayast-na-Shayast 13:29

Ancient Rome
Seneca the Younger ( – 65 CE), a practitioner of Stoicism ( – 200 CE) expressed a hierarchical variation of the Golden Rule in his Letter 47, an essay regarding the treatment of slaves: "Treat your inferior as you would wish your superior to treat you."

Religious context

According to Simon Blackburn, the Golden Rule "can be found in some form in almost every ethical tradition". A multi-faith poster showing the Golden Rule in sacred writings from 13 faith traditions (designed by Paul McKenna of Scarboro Missions, 2000) has been on permanent display at the Headquarters of the United Nations since 4 January 2002. Creating the poster "took five years of research that included consultations with experts in each of the 13 faith groups." (See also the section on Global Ethic.)

Abrahamic religions

Judaism

A rule of reciprocal altruism was stated positively in a well-known Torah verse:

Hillel the Elder ( – 10 CE), used this verse as a most important message of the Torah for his teachings. Once, he was challenged by a gentile who asked to be converted under the condition that the Torah be explained to him while he stood on one foot. Hillel accepted him as a candidate for conversion to Judaism but, drawing on Leviticus 19:18, briefed the man:

Hillel recognized brotherly love as the fundamental principle of Jewish ethics. Rabbi Akiva agreed, while Simeon ben Azzai suggested that the principle of love must have its foundation in Genesis chapter 1, which teaches that all men are the offspring of Adam, who was made in the image of God. According to Jewish rabbinic literature, the first man Adam represents the unity of mankind. This is echoed in the modern preamble of the Universal Declaration of Human Rights. And it is also taught, that Adam is last in order according to the evolutionary character of God's creation:Why was only a single specimen of man created first? To teach us that he who destroys a single soul destroys a whole world and that he who saves a single soul saves a whole world; furthermore, so no race or class may claim a nobler ancestry, saying, 'Our father was born first'; and, finally, to give testimony to the greatness of the Lord, who caused the wonderful diversity of mankind to emanate from one type. And why was Adam created last of all beings? To teach him humility; for if he be overbearing, let him remember that the little fly preceded him in the order of creation.

The Jewish Publication Society's edition of Leviticus states:Thou shalt not hate thy brother, in thy heart; thou shalt surely rebuke thy neighbour, and not bear sin because of him. 18 Thou shalt not take vengeance, nor bear any grudge against the children of thy people, but thou shalt love thy neighbour as thyself: I am the .This Torah verse represents one of several versions of the Golden Rule, which itself appears in various forms, positive and negative. It is the earliest written version of that concept in a positive form.

At the turn of the era, the Jewish rabbis were discussing the scope of the meaning of Leviticus 19:18 and 19:34 extensively:

Commentators interpret that this applies to foreigners (= Samaritans), proselytes (= 'strangers who reside with you') and Jews. 

On the verse, "Love your fellow as yourself", the classic commentator Rashi quotes from Torat Kohanim, an early Midrashic text regarding the famous dictum of Rabbi Akiva: "Love your fellow as yourself – Rabbi Akiva says this is a great principle of the Torah."

Israel's postal service quoted from the previous Leviticus verse when it commemorated the Universal Declaration of Human Rights on a 1958 postage stamp.

Christianity

The "Golden Rule" was proclaimed by Jesus of Nazareth during his Sermon on the Mount and described by him as the second great commandment. The common English phrasing is "Do unto others as you would have them do unto you". A similar form of the phrase appeared in a Catholic catechism around 1567 (certainly in the reprint of 1583). Various applications of the Golden Rule are stated positively numerous times in the Old Testament: "Thou shalt not avenge, nor bear any grudge against the children of thy people, but thou shalt love thy neighbour as thyself." Or, in Leviticus 19:34: "But treat them just as you treat your own citizens. Love foreigners as you love yourselves, because you were foreigners one time in Egypt. I am the Lord your God.".

The Old Testament Deuterocanonical books of Tobit and Sirach, accepted as part of the Scriptural canon by Catholic Church, Eastern Orthodoxy, and the Non-Chalcedonian Churches, express a negative form of the golden rule:

Two passages in the New Testament quote Jesus of Nazareth espousing the positive form of the Golden rule:

A similar passage, a parallel to the Great Commandment, is Luke 10:25.

The passage in the book of Luke then continues with Jesus answering the question, "Who is my neighbor?", by telling the parable of the Good Samaritan, which John Wesley interprets as meaning that "your neighbor" is anyone in need.

Jesus' teaching goes beyond the negative formulation of not doing what one would not like done to themselves, to the positive formulation of actively doing good to another that, if the situations were reversed, one would desire that the other would do for them. This formulation, as indicated in the parable of the Good Samaritan, emphasizes the needs for positive action that brings benefit to another, not simply restraining oneself from negative activities that hurt another.

In one passage of the New Testament, Paul the Apostle refers to the golden rule, restating Jesus' second commandment:

St. Paul also comments on the golden rule in the book of Romans:

Islam

The Arabian peninsula was known to not practice the golden rule prior to the advent of Islam. According to Th. Emil Homerin: "Pre-Islamic Arabs regarded the survival of the tribe, as most essential and to be ensured by the ancient rite of blood vengeance." Homerin goes on to say:

From the hadith, the collected oral and written accounts of Muhammad and his teachings during his lifetime:

Ali ibn Abi Talib (4th Caliph in Sunni Islam, and first Imam in Shia Islam) says:

Baháʼí Faith

The writings of the Baháʼí Faith encourage everyone to treat others as they would treat themselves and even prefer others over oneself:

Indian religions

Hinduism

Also,

Buddhism

Buddha (Siddhartha Gautama, –543 BCE) made the negative formulation of the golden rule one of the cornerstones of his ethics in the 6th century BCE. It occurs in many places and in many forms throughout the Tripitaka.

Jainism

The Golden Rule is paramount in the Jainist philosophy and can be seen in the doctrines of ahimsa and karma. As part of the prohibition of causing any living beings to suffer, Jainism forbids inflicting upon others what is harmful to oneself.

The following line from the Acaranga Sutra sums up the philosophy of Jainism:

Sikhism

Chinese religions

Confucianism

The same idea is also presented in V.12 and VI.30 of the Analects, which can be found in the online Chinese Text Project. The phraseology differs from the Christian version of the Golden Rule. It does not presume to do anything unto others, but merely to avoid doing what would be harmful. It does not preclude doing good deeds and taking moral positions.

Taoism

Mohism

Mozi regarded the golden rule as a corollary to the cardinal virtue of impartiality, and encouraged egalitarianism and selflessness in relationships.

Iranian religions

Zoroastrianism

New religious movements

Wicca

Scientology

Traditional African religions

Yoruba

Odinani

Secular context

Global ethic

The "Declaration Toward a Global Ethic" from the Parliament of the World’s Religions (1993) proclaimed the Golden Rule ("We must treat others as we wish others to treat us") as the common principle for many religions. The Initial Declaration was signed by 143 leaders from all of the world's major faiths, including Baháʼí Faith, Brahmanism, Brahma Kumaris, Buddhism, Christianity, Hinduism, Indigenous, Interfaith, Islam, Jainism, Judaism, Native American, Neo-Pagan, Sikhism, Taoism, Theosophist, Unitarian Universalist and Zoroastrian. In the folklore of several cultures the Golden Rule is depicted by the allegory of the long spoons.

Humanism

In the view of Greg M. Epstein, a Humanist chaplain at Harvard University, " 'do unto others' ... is a concept that essentially no religion misses entirely. But not a single one of these versions of the golden rule requires a God". Various sources identify the Golden Rule as a humanist principle:

Existentialism

Classical Utilitarianism

John Stuart Mill in his book, Utilitarianism (originally published in 1861), wrote, "In the golden rule of Jesus of Nazareth, we read the complete spirit of the ethics of utility. 'To do as you would be done by,' and 'to love your neighbour as yourself,' constitute the ideal perfection of utilitarian morality."

Other contexts

Human rights
According to Marc H. Bornstein, and William E. Paden, the Golden Rule is arguably the most essential basis for the modern concept of human rights, in which each individual has a right to just treatment, and a reciprocal responsibility to ensure justice for others.

However, Leo Damrosch argued that the notion that the Golden Rule pertains to "rights" per se is a contemporary interpretation and has nothing to do with its origin. The development of human "rights" is a modern political ideal that began as a philosophical concept promulgated through the philosophy of Jean Jacques Rousseau in 18th century France, among others. His writings influenced Thomas Jefferson, who then incorporated Rousseau's reference to "inalienable rights" into the United States Declaration of Independence in 1776. Damrosch argued that to confuse the Golden Rule with human rights is to apply contemporary thinking to ancient concepts.

Science and economics

There has been research published arguing that some 'sense' of fair play and the Golden Rule may be stated and rooted in terms of neuroscientific and neuroethical principles.

The Golden Rule can also be explained from the perspectives of psychology, philosophy, sociology, human evolution, and economics. Psychologically, it involves a person empathizing with others. Philosophically, it involves a person perceiving their neighbor also as "I" or "self". Sociologically, "love your neighbor as yourself" is applicable between individuals, between groups, and also between individuals and groups. In evolution, "reciprocal altruism" is seen as a distinctive advance in the capacity of human groups to survive and reproduce, as their exceptional brains demanded exceptionally long childhoods and ongoing provision and protection even beyond that of the immediate family. In economics, Richard Swift, referring to ideas from David Graeber, suggests that "without some kind of reciprocity society would no longer be able to exist."

Study of other primates provides evidence that the Golden Rule exists in other non-human species.

Criticism
Philosophers, such as Immanuel Kant and Friedrich Nietzsche, have objected to the rule on a variety of grounds. The most serious among these is its application. How does one know how others want to be treated? The obvious way is to ask them, but this cannot be done if one assumes they have not reached a particular and relevant understanding. One religion that officially rejects the Golden Rule is the Neo-Nazi religion of the "Creativity Movement" founded by Ben Klassen. Followers of the religion believe that the Golden Rule doesn't make sense and is a "completely unworkable principle.".

Differences in values or interests
George Bernard Shaw wrote, "Do not do unto others as you would that they should do unto you. Their tastes may not be the same." This suggests that if your values are not shared with others, the way you want to be treated will not be the way they want to be treated. Hence, the Golden Rule of "do unto others" is "dangerous in the wrong hands", according to philosopher Iain King, because "some fanatics have no aversion to death: the Golden Rule might inspire them to kill others in suicide missions."

Differences in situations
Immanuel Kant famously criticized the golden rule for not being sensitive to differences of situation, noting that a prisoner duly convicted of a crime could appeal to the golden rule while asking the judge to release him, pointing out that the judge would not want anyone else to send him to prison, so he should not do so to others. On the other hand, in a critique of the consistency of Kant's writings, several authors have noted the "similarity" between the Golden Rule and Kant's Categorical Imperative, introduced in Groundwork of the Metaphysic of Morals (See discussion at this link).

Responses to criticisms
Walter Terence Stace, in The Concept of Morals (1937), wrote:

Marcus George Singer observed that there are two importantly different ways of looking at the golden rule: as requiring (1) that you perform specific actions that you want others to do to you or (2) that you guide your behavior in the same general ways that you want others to. Counter-examples to the golden rule typically are more forceful against the first than the second.

In his book on the golden rule, Jeffrey Wattles makes the similar observation that such objections typically arise while applying the golden rule in certain general ways (namely, ignoring differences in taste, in situation, and so forth). But if we apply the golden rule to our own method of using it, asking in effect if we would want other people to apply the golden rule in such ways, the answer would typically be no, since it is quite predictable that others' ignoring of such factors will lead to behavior which we object to. It follows that we should not do so ourselves—according to the golden rule. In this way, the golden rule may be self-correcting. An article by Jouni Reinikainen develops this suggestion in greater detail.

 
It is possible, then, that the golden rule can itself guide us in identifying which differences of situation are morally relevant. We would often want other people to ignore any prejudice against our race or nationality when deciding how to act towards us, but would also want them to not ignore our differing preferences in food, desire for aggressiveness, and so on. This principle of "doing unto others, wherever possible, as they would be done by..." has sometimes been termed the platinum rule.

Popular references
Charles Kingsley's The Water Babies (1863) includes a character named Mrs Do-As-You-Would-Be-Done-By (and another, Mrs Be-Done-By-As-You-Did).

See also
 Empathy
 General welfare clause
 Norm of reciprocity, social norm of in-kind responses to the behavior of others
 Reciprocity (cultural anthropology), way of defining people's informal exchange of goods and labour
 Reciprocity (evolution), mechanisms for the evolution of cooperation
 Reciprocity (international relations), principle that favours, benefits, or penalties that are granted by one state to the citizens or legal entities of another, should be returned in kind
 Reciprocity (social and political philosophy), concept of reciprocity as in-kind positive or negative responses for the actions of others; relation to justice; related ideas such as gratitude, mutuality, and the Golden Rule
 Reciprocity (social psychology), in-kind positive or negative responses of individuals towards the actions of others
 Serial reciprocity, where the benefactor of a gift or service will in turn provide benefits to a third party
 Ubuntu (philosophy), an ethical philosophy originating from Southern Africa, which has been summarised as 'A person is a person through other people'

References

External links
 
 
 The Golden Rule Movie A teaching resource.
 Golden Rule Day An annual global event every April 5.
 Golden Rule Project - learning tools, etc. (based in Salt Lake City, Utah, USA)
 Monmouth Center for World Religions and Ethical Thought. The Golden Rule
 
 Scarboro Mission. The Golden Rule Educational, participatory, and interactive resources including videos, exercises, multi-disciplinary commentaries, The Golden Rule Poster, and interfaith dialogues on the Golden Rule.
 St Columbans Mission Society – Interfaith Relations. The Golden Rule The Golden Rule Poster, etc.

Codes of conduct
Ethical principles
Interpersonal relationships
Life skills
Philosophy of law
Positive Mitzvoth
Religious practices
Sermon on the Mount